Qorban Kandi (also Romanized as Qorbān Kandī) is a village in Gavdul-e Sharqi Rural District, in the Central District of Malekan County, East Azerbaijan Province, Iran. At the 2006 census, its population was 398, in 116 families.

References 

Populated places in Malekan County